The 63rd Annual Tony Awards, which recognized Broadway productions of the 2008-2009 season, were presented on June 7, 2009 at Radio City Music Hall in New York City. The ceremony was broadcast by CBS, hosted by Neil Patrick Harris.

The cut-off date for eligibility for the awards was April 30, 2009. Nominations were announced on May 5, 2009 by Cynthia Nixon and Lin-Manuel Miranda. Of the musicals, Billy Elliot the Musical received 15 nominations, every one that it was eligible for, which tied for the most received by any Broadway production until this record was surpassed by Hamilton (16), followed by the Pulitzer Prize for Drama winner Next to Normal with eleven.  Among the nominees for Best Revival of a Musical, Hair had the most nominations, with eight.  Of the plays, the revivals Mary Stuart and The Norman Conquests tied for the most nominations, with seven each.  All four stars of God of Carnage were nominated, as was the play itself.  Billy Elliot won 10 awards, the most of the night, including Best Musical. Next to Normal and God of Carnage each won three.

The Isabelle Stevenson Award, a non-competitive award named after the late president of the American Theatre Wing, was presented for the first time. Its purpose is to recognize individuals from the theatre community who have volunteered time to one or more humanitarian, social service, or charitable organizations. The first recipient of this honor was Phyllis Newman. This was the first non-competitive category to be introduced since the Tony Honors for Excellence in the Theatre was established in 1990.

The broadcast won the 2009 Primetime Emmy Award for Outstanding Special Class Programs. The telecast also was nominated in the category of Outstanding Art Direction for Variety, Music or Nonfiction Programming.

Pre-telecast events
The Visa Signature Tony Awards Preview Concert featured performers from the musicals Guys and Dolls, Hair, West Side Story, 9 to 5; Billy Elliot the Musical, Next to Normal, Rock of Ages, and Shrek The Musical. The concert was televised on various CBS stations, and in New York City on May 30. Newscaster Harry Smith from The Early Show hosted the special.

The red-carpet arrivals and pre-Tony telecast awards (Creative Arts Awards) were webcast on TonyAwards.com.  A Creative Arts Awards (CAA) ceremony, hosted by Laura Benanti and Brian Stokes Mitchell, was held prior to the main ceremony. The CAA presented the awards for orchestrations and scenery, costume, lighting and sound design.

Presenters
Presenters included Lucie Arnaz, Kate Burton, Kristin Chenoweth, Jeff Daniels, Hope Davis, Edie Falco, Will Ferrell, Carrie Fisher, Jane Fonda, Hallie Foote, James Gandolfini, Lauren Graham, Colin Hanks, Marcia Gay Harden, Anne Hathaway, Jessica Lange, Frank Langella, Angela Lansbury, Audra McDonald, David Hyde Pierce, Piper Perabo, Oliver Platt, Susan Sarandon, John Stamos and Chandra Wilson.

Performances
Performances included scenes from nine Broadway musicals: Billy Elliot the Musical (with an appearance by Elton John); Guys and Dolls, with Tituss Burgess and company performing "Sit Down, You're Rockin' the Boat" (at the start of the performance, Burgess's microphone was not working, so a stagehand ran up to him to give him a handheld); Hair, with the company performing the title song and "Let the Sunshine In"; Next to Normal, with Alice Ripley, J. Robert Spencer, and Aaron Tveit performing "You Don't Know/I Am The One"; Pal Joey, represented by Stockard Channing singing a few lines from "Bewitched, Bothered, and Bewildered" during the opening segment; Rock of Ages, with Constantine Maroulis and fellow cast members singing "Don't Stop Believin'"; Shrek the Musical, with the company performing "What's Up, Duloc"; West Side Story, with the company performing the Dance At The Gym; and 9 to 5, with Dolly Parton joining the cast to sing the title tune.  Cast members from national touring companies of three musicals also appeared: The lead character from four Jersey Boys casts (Joseph Leo Bwarie (Toronto), Rick Faugno (Las Vegas), Courter Simmons (national tour) and Dominic Scaglione, Jr. (Chicago) sang together with Jarrod Spector from the Broadway cast; Legally Blonde spotlighted Becky Gulsvig; and Michelle Dawson, Kittra Wynn Coomer and Rachel Tyler from the national tour of Mamma Mia! sang "Dancing Queen" with fellow cast members.

Performers from the nominated Best Plays category presented brief clips of those plays, which included God of Carnage, 33 Variations, Dividing the Estate and Reasons to Be Pretty.

Liza Minnelli performed in the opening sequence, and rock icon Bret Michaels and his band Poison joined the cast of Rock of Ages during their segment in the opening number, performing the band's 1988 Top Ten hit "Nothin' but a Good Time". While exiting the stage, Michaels was struck in the head by a descending set and knocked to the floor. He suffered a fractured nose and a split lip that required three stitches.  He subsequently sued the event's organizers, claiming that the collision led to his 2010 brain hemorrhage. The suit was settled in May 2012 for an undisclosed amount.

Neil Patrick Harris ended the show with a pastiche of "Tonight" from West Side Story and "Luck Be a Lady" from Guys and Dolls, with lyrics re-written by Marc Shaiman and Scott Wittman that recapped the awards.

Competitive awards
Winners in bold.

In Memoriam
Bebe Neuwirth introduced a special number to honor those who died during the past theatre season. The Broadway Inspirational Voices and orchestra performed "What I Did for Love" from A Chorus Line. Broadway theatres dimmed their lights in memoriam, as well. Among those remembered were:

Natasha Richardson
Gerald Schoenfeld
Harold Pinter
Luther Davis
Estelle Getty 
Dale Wasserman
A. Larry Haines
Edie Adams
Bruce Adler
Horton Foote
James Whitmore
Sydney Chaplin
Clive Barnes
Marilyn Cooper
Tom O'Horgan
Bea Arthur
Ron Silver 
Robert Prosky
Roy Somlyo
Robert Anderson
Lee Solters
Pat Hingle
Irving Cheskin
Anna Manahan
Sam Cohn
George Furth
Eartha Kitt 
Hugh Leonard
Rodger McFarlane
William Gibson
Tharon Musser
Paul Sills
Lawrence Miller
Paul Newman

Non-competitive awards
 Tony Award for Lifetime Achievement in the Theatre – Jerry Herman
 Regional Theatre Tony Award – Signature Theatre, Arlington, Virginia
 Isabelle Stevenson Award – Phyllis Newman
 Tony Honors for Excellence in Theatre – Press Agent Shirley Herz

Multiple nominations and awards

These productions had multiple nominations:

15 nominations: Billy Elliot the Musical
11 nominations: Next to Normal 
8 nominations: Hair &  Shrek The Musical
7 nominations: Mary Stuart & The Norman Conquests 
6 nominations: God of Carnage & Joe Turner's Come and Gone
5 nominations: Rock of Ages & 33 Variations
4 nominations: Exit the King, 9 to 5, Pal Joey & West Side Story
3 nominations: Reasons to Be Pretty & Waiting for Godot
2 nominations: Blithe Spirit, Dividing the Estate, Equus, Guys and Dolls & White Christmas

The following productions received multiple awards.
10 wins: Billy Elliot the Musical
3 wins: God of Carnage & Next to Normal
2 wins: Joe Turner's Come and Gone

See also
 Drama Desk Awards
 2009 Laurence Olivier Awards – equivalent awards for West End theatre productions
 Obie Award
 New York Drama Critics' Circle
 Theatre World Award
 Lucille Lortel Awards

References

External links

Tony Awards
Tony Awards ceremonies
2009 awards in the United States
Tony Awards
2000s in Manhattan
Television shows directed by Glenn Weiss